October 1 (2014) is a Nigerian dark psychological thriller film written by Tunde Babalola, and produced and directed by Kunle Afolayan. It stars Sadiq Daba, Kayode Olaiya, David Bailie, Kehinde Bankole, Kanayo O. Kanayo, Fabian Adeoye Lojede, Nick Rhys, Kunle Afolayan, Femi Adebayo, Bimbo Manuel, Ibrahim Chatta, and introduces Demola Adedoyin; it also features a special appearance by Deola Sagoe. The film is set in the last months of Colonial Nigeria in 1960. It recounts the story of Danladi Waziri (Sadiq Daba), a police officer from Northern Nigeria who is posted to a remote town of Akote in Western Nigeria to investigate the frequent female murders in the community. He is supposed to solve the mystery before the Nigerian flag is raised on October 1, 1960, Nigeria's Independence Day.

Production
Casting the lead character, Danladi Waziri, posed a challenge, as the director had a particular look he wanted for the character. Sadiq Daba was selected for the role after much testing and research. This role marked his return to the big screen after more than a ten-year absence from the industry. The film was funded by sponsorships from the Lagos State Government, Toyota Nigeria, Elizade Motors, Guinness, and Sovereign Trust Insurance.

After four months of pre-production, it was shot in Lagos and Ondo State for a period of over forty days using RED cameras. Production design for the film was done by Pat Nebo, who had worked with Kunle Afolayan in previous film projects. Nebo and his team made almost half of the props used in the film; other props, such as 1950s television sets, shotguns, and antique vehicles, were acquired and refurbished for the film. Golden Effects partnered with Haute Couture to provide period costumes used in the film.

Plot
The film opens with images of a young woman being raped by a seemingly unknown man. Inspector Danladi Waziri (Sadiq Daba) is summoned by the British colonial military to present a draft of his findings on the series of virgin killings that have occurred in Akote. The film flashes back, as Inspector Waziri narrates his story on his observations and experience from his arrival in the town of Akote; he is warmly received by Sergeant Afonja (Kayode Olaiya). On arriving at the village square, Danladi Waziri notices the villagers celebrating a horse-rider, who is later noted by Afonja to be Prince Aderopo (Demola Adedoyin). Just returned from the major city, he is the first university graduate in the community.

Waziri notices patterns of physical and circumstantial similarities in the murdered women and concludes that these are serial killings. He and Afonja continue investigations; they interrogate Agbekoya (Kunle Afolayan), owner of the farm where the last woman was killed. Agbekoya had no knowledge of events that may have led to the murders. He is released by Inspector Waziri due to a perceived language barrier between them, Waziri Danladi did not understand the Yoruba language spoken by Agbekoya.

After being cautioned by the Oba about his late night movements, Prince Aderopo visits the village bar, where he meets his childhood friends, Banji (Femi Adebayo) and Tawa (Kehinde Bankole); the trio discuss the coming independence and their pasts. One of the guards assigned to protect the prince deserts his post to spend some time with his lover, close to a stream. Afonja and Waziri question the traditional priest, Baba Ifa (Ifayemi Elebuibon) on their way out of the bar. He responds as if with proverbs, and says that the killer will continue until he is satisfied. The next day, the dead body of the guard's lover is discovered.

Waziri orders the arrest of Baba Ifa, which Afonja refuses to carry out. Waziri suspends him and puts his deputy in his place, Corporal Omolodun (Fabian Adeoye Lojede). Omolodun is killed after trailing the killer along a bush path, following the discovery of the body of an Igbo girl. The girl's father, farmer Okafor (Kanayo O. Kanayo), along with his tribesmen, capture a traveling Hausa Northerner, and claim he killed the farmer's daughter. The accused man is taken into custody by the police, but maintains his innocence. Waziri tells his superiors that he has found the killer and will be closing the case. As he is about to transfer the Northerner away from Akote, Okafor throws a machete at him, piercing his heart. Even with his dying breath, the man insists he didn't kill the girl. Okafor, who repeatedly affirms his actions as doing what a real man would do, is taken into custody. At night, the officers gather to celebrate the Inspector's impending departure following the presumed victory over the killer. Dandali is persuaded into drinking against his will. On his way out he hears someone whistle a tune he was earlier told by the Northerner to be from the killer. The killer approaches him but he is too drunk to identify the face, and is assaulted by the killer.

Afonja sees him lying on the road and takes him to his residence. Afonja and his wife gave him herbs for relief of his constant catarrh. During the process of his recovery from his fever, he recollects the face of the killer. The next morning, he goes to the market square to observe the body language of Prince Aderopo, who suspiciously stares at him in confidence and even winks at him that there is no evidence to prove he indeed killed the girls. Danladi visits Tawa in the school she works as a teacher, in order to question her about the relationship she has with the Prince. Danladi discovers that Aderopo and Agbekoya are both recipients of a scholarship from a Reverend Father in the town, Father Dowling (Colin David Reese). Danladi visits Agbekoya, who reveals to him that they were constantly molested by the Reverend Father in Lagos City. At a celebration on the eve of Independence, Prince Aderopo invites Tawa to their childhood hideout, which has been renovated. Danladi and Afonja try to trail them, but are unsuccessful; Agbekoya, the only other person who knows the location of the hideout, leads them to it. On getting there, Aderopo is about to make Tawa his sixth victim, representing the end of the six years of violation he received from the Reverend Father. Tawa is saved.

The film shifts back to the present day, as Danladi concludes his account to the British officers. The officers are against his desire to speak the truth on the identity of the real killer and they instruct him not to tell anyone about it. He reluctantly agrees to their demands for the sake of peaceful independence.

Cast
Sadiq Daba as Inspector Danladi Waziri
Kayode Aderupoko as Inspector Sunday Afonja
Demola Adedoyin as Prince Aderopo
Kehinde Bankole as Miss Tawa
Kunle Afolayan as Agbekoya
Fabian Adeoye Lojede as Corporal Omolodun
Kanayo O. Kanayo as Okafor
Ibrahim Chatta as Sumonu
Bimbo Manuel as Canon Kuforiji
Femi Adebayo as Banji
Abiodun Aleja as Olaitan
Nick Rhys as Winterbottom
Deola Sagoe as Funmilayo Ransome-Kuti
David Bailie as Ackerman
Colin David Reese as Reverend Dowling
Lawrence Stubbings as Tomkins
Ifayemi Elebuibon as Baba Ifa
 Meg Otanwa as Yejide

Production

Development
Kunle Afolayan wanted a story set in a small community; he had writers submit scripts before he met Tunde Babalola, who eventually was hired to write the screenplay. The script was initially submitted with the title Dust, as the story is set in a very dusty town.

Although Afolayan didn't want to do big budget projects at the time, he needed to in order to interpret this film adequately because it is a "national film with a universal appeal". He said that he liked the story of October 1 because it was a period piece, which he had never done before. He noted that "it is also significant to the present state of Nigeria". He added his own ideas to the subsequent drafts of the script to deepen the film. In an interview, Afolayan said that October 1 is not just an entertainment, but also informative: 
"For the older generation, especially those who were part of independence, they will be able to see themselves in this film. For the younger generation it's a platform for many of them who don't know the story of Nigeria".

Release
After several release postponements, the film had a number of special screenings and eventually premiered on 28 September 2014. Its premiere was tagged "'60s", and guests were asked to dress in native costumes and hairstyles from the 1960s. The premiere also provided tours of sets, and displayed the props and costumes used in the film.

Reception
The film was met with positive critical reception, mostly praised for its production design, cinematography and its exploration of themes including tribalism, western imperialism, paedophilia, and Nigeria's unification. It established a strong connection between western culture and Islamist resistance such as the Boko Haram insurgency in Nigeria. He also stated that: "We want the younger generation to know where we are coming from and the older generation to see if we are moving in the right direction".

As with Golden Effects' previous productions, the film was sponsored by numerous figures, Lagos State Government was soon announced as one of the major sponsors of the film. Other major sponsors include Toyota Nigeria, Elizade Motors, Guinness, and Sovereign Trust Insurance.

Casting

According to Afolayan, care had to be taken during casting as it is one of the key areas that could make or break a film like October 1. The audition for the film which took place on 6 June 2013 at Golden Effects Studios in Ikeja recorded over 1000 people in attendance.

The lead character of Dan Waziri posed a challenge; a Northerner is needed to play the role, and Afolayan stated that there is a particular "look" that has been associated with people of the sixties. He also pointed out that he needed an actor who could not only speak Hausa, but would represent the ethnic group as well. No one seemed to tick these essential boxes, until Sadiq Daba came to mind. However, his whereabouts were not known at the time as the last time he had been seen was in the 1998 Mahmood Ali-Balogun's short film A Place Called Home, produced by MNet. Eventually, Afolayan was able to find a recent interview he granted, thereby getting connected to Daba through the interviewer. Sadiq Daba was prepared for Waziri's character for a period of 8 months before filming commenced. On a day of shoot, a serious disagreement occurred between Daba and Afolayan that Daba walked out on set; the dispute however was eventually settled and shooting was resumed. Daba in an interview expressed enthusiastically that Kunle Afolayan is a filmmaker he was glad to be associated with.

The character of Funmilayo Ransome-Kuti was another challenging aspect of casting; Afolayan had to research on the Kutis for some time in order to learn about some dominant physical features that might be common with the family. He also announced it on Twitter that he was looking for an actress with close resemblance to the late Funmilayo Kuti, but to no avail. When the director met designer, Deola Sagoe for the costume design of the film, he would always "see this round face like the Kutis" and he eventually asked her out on the role. She agreed to the role after three weeks of Afolayan's persistence and convincing.

Kunle Afolayan like in his previous films featured in October 1 as a farmer with the name Agbekoya. For his role, he had to leave his hair for sometime in order to let it just grow. He also stated in an interview with Toni Kan and Peju Akande on Africa Magic that some other actors were also asked to leave their hair and beard for about a year for the film.

Filming
Filming which was initially scheduled for July commenced in August 2013, with the actors' first reading taking place on 5 August, after four months of preproduction. Shooting began at the old Railway Quarters in Lagos from where they proceeded to Ilara-Mokin, a small village in Ondo State. The director with some other crew members had previously been to Ilara-Mokin to scout for filming locations in May 2013. Scenes were also filmed at Federal College of Agriculture, Akure and few neighbouring villages around Akure. Toyota Nigeria provided transportation for the cast, crew and filming equipment throughout the course of filming. It also provided accommodation for the cast and crew while shooting in Ilara-Mokin, which is the hometown of the company's Chairman. The film was shot using RED cameras. Modern inventions captured during principal photography were all digitally removed during post-production.

Principal photography ended in September 2013 after 42 days of shoot. Afolayan in an interview with Weekend Magazine expressed that it was very stressful shooting October 1 and his previous films were incomparable to it. He stated that it was more challenging, more demanding and it has a budget of over four times that of his previous film. He also said there were times when he and the crew had just three hours of sleep in four days, but however pointed out that he had the best hands on deck for the project and he is grateful for that. The film production team on set was made up of about a hundred people. Production Co-ordinator, Oge Ogu noted that one of the major challenges during filming was co-ordinating and managing the extras to fit into the director's vision, as the crowd often span into hundreds of people.

Design

Almost half of the props used in October 1 were made by Pat Nebo, the art director and his team. Props were also brought from United States and the United Kingdom, including television sets and shotguns from the fifties as they were not available in Nigeria. After writing several letters to the Nigerian Police Department to request for antique weapons and costumes, it was realized that the department didn't archive its artefacts, so most historical items have been destroyed. There were no Toyota vehicles in Nigeria in the sixties; this made it impossible for Toyota Nigeria to provide props for the film. Some of the antique vehicles used in the film were sourced in Nigeria; most were however refurbished for the owners so that they can be used in the film. The props used in the film are currently kept in Golden Effects Studios and can be rented out to other filmmakers that may need them in future. There was also an exhibition at the premiere of the film displaying the antique items used in October 1.

Golden Effects partnered with fashion designer, Deola Sagoe of Haute Couture, who also featured as the late Funmilayo Ransome-Kuti in the film to design the primordial costumes used in the film. Costume Designer, Susan Akalazu, noted that she had to watch many documentaries and read documentations on events from the 1960s in order to understand the style prevalent during that era in Nigeria.

On the visual look of the film, the cinematographer, Yinka Edward revealed that he didn't want to adopt the high contrast/sharp lighting look, common with most thriller films. Rather, he wanted a more realistic and natural look, since the antagonist has a strong emotional reason for being who he is.

Soundtracks

Release

Promotions
During the filming of October 1, onset pictures were constantly released to the public via the film's social media pages. A first poster for the film was released on 9 June 2013, which depicted a juxtaposition of the Nigerian and British flag backdropped by an ancient town. On 11 September 2013, Golden Effects unveiled a set of character posters for the film at the Toyota office in Lagos, stakeholders present at the event include Executive Director of Toyota Nigeria and Lagos State Permanent Secretary of Special Duties. The first trailer of the film was released on 1 October 2013, Nigeria's 53rd Independence day, a date initially slated for the film release itself. The trailer went ahead to win the "Best Fiction Film Trailer" award at the 2013 International Movie Trailers Festival Awards. A movie teaser and a theatrical promotional trailer was also released on YouTube on 27 August 2014.

Pre-release
The film was initially slated to be released on 1 October 2013 to coincide with Nigeria's 53rd Independence anniversary, but it got postponed to February 2014 due to unfinished post production. The film was however not released on the specified date and several other release dates were subsequently posted on the internet including 25 April, May and June 2014. Golden Effects eventually announced that a release date for the film couldn't be specified, and that the several postponements were due to the other highly anticipated films that had been scheduled for release in 2014 including: Render to Caesar released in March, Half of a Yellow Sun in April (later shifted to August) and others like '76 and Dazzling Mirage without release dates yet; Afolayan pointed out that the films needed to be spaced in order to maximize box office returns. It was revealed that there will be more than one cut for the film; a cut for the local [Nigerian] audience, a cut for African audience, a cut for film festivals and probably another cut for international release.

A private screening of October 1 organized by Terra Kulture was held at the InterContinental Lagos on 21 May 2014 with many stakeholders in attendance, the film reportedly received positive reactions at the event. The film also had up to five other private and exclusive screenings before its release, all organized by Terra Kulture. "The Making of...." documentary on October 1 started airing on Dstv's Africa Magic channels on 7 September 2014.

Premiere and release
October 1 premiered at the EXPO Centre, Eko Hotel and Suites on 28 September 2014; the theme of the event was "'60s", as a result had most celebrities dressed in primordial native attires and hair styles. There was an exhibition at the premiere, which provided tour of the sets, and also displayed the costumes and props used for the film. The red carpet event was also broadcast live on DStv's Africa Magic channels. The film was first released in selected cinemas on 1 October 2014, and had the cinemas inflate their ticket prices. It went on general release on 3 October 2014. October 1 was screened at the 2014 Cultural Confidence, New York on 11 October 2014; it was also officially selected for the 2014 Africa International Film Festival, where it was reported that tickets were constantly sold out. The film premiered in the United Kingdom on 3 November 2014 at the 2014 Film Africa Festival in London. October 1 also opened the 4th Africa Film Week in Greece.

Reception

Critical reception
The film since its release, has been positively received by film critics. Nollywood Reinvented rated the movie 72% and praises it for the sense of pride it leaves the viewer with at the end. Toni Kan of ThisDay praised its cinematography, story and casting, concluding that: "October 1 provokes a lot of questions and provides few answers but what is unequivocal is that at the end of the movie when the picture of the Queen is taken down, Kunle Afolayan, son of Ade Love, is crowned King". Onyeka Nwelue of The Trent, praised the artistic nature of the film, its subtle messages, and concluded: "Mr. Afolayan incorporates facts into fiction to create an everlasting joy in this work. He is not one who is scared of exploring, and he does so beautifully. He takes his time to create. He takes his time to understand the people he is making films for. No matter how intellectually stimulating October 1 is, it can be enjoyed by anybody. At the end, one can easily say, Mr. Afolayan’s October 1 is for everyone who loves great films". Sodas and Popcorn praised its production design, the performances from the actors, use of costumes, and also described the cinematography as "the best work of art in Nigerian cinematic history". It commended the film for its attention to detail and concluded: "Afolayan obviously had clear vision of what he set out to achieve and pushed his cast to give the best possible performance you could expect from them. The glory of the film, however, is in the fact that the story is not afraid to go there: explore the timeless themes of religion, ethnic rifts, corruption, abuse, pain and privilege. The film plays for 2 hours but there is enough suspense and laugh-till-your-sides-hurt humour to keep you at the edge of your seat".

Efeturi Doghudje of 360Nobs commended the character development, praised the performance of Demola Adedoyin, and the costume design. She rated the film 9 out of 10, and concluded: "Script writer Tunde Babalola, was incredible, as October 1, was much more than just an entertaining feature, it was deep, intense and had that suspense that got us in the hall talking. Asides attention to detail, Babalola paid as much attention to the script trying to relive the experience of the 1960s and tying it perfectly to the British way of governing us, our tribal issues and our eventual independence. It [October 1] was pieced together wonderfully and creatively executed. October 1 is a must see for all". Wilfred Okiche of YNaija praised its production design, and concluded: "In many ways, October 1 is a typical Kunle Afolayan film, what with the ensemble cast, big budget, period setting, ambitious story and dark psychological suspense. But where he does not leave an indelible mark on the film, one that will in future days be identified as the Afolayan touch. He proves once again and maybe for the first time in film this year, that ambition is good and no one can represent Nigeria better than Nigerians. Nollywood is rising indeed, and October 1 is a shining example". Amarachukwu Iwuala of Pulse NG praised the subtle themes in the film, while noting Kayode Olaiya as the highlight performance, and concluded that although "October 1 is not fast-paced, the action nonetheless unravels at a rate that keeps everyone in suspense. The film aptly integrates several interesting subplots; smartly employing subtext and irony. This 140-minute picture is another feat for Nollywood". Augustine Ogwo of News Wire comments: "October 1 is brilliant, thought-provoking and timeless. October 1 preaches the truth and it does so from an artistic point of view. Kudos must be given to Tunde Babalola for writing such an amazing script and also to the producer/director of this movie for breathing life into the story. October 1 is such a good movie that it has the power to plunge every well meaning Nigerian into a reflective mood and possibly positive action".

Isabella Akinseye of Nolly Silver Screen however gave a mixed review; while praising the cinematography and generally the production, she talked down on the plot and scripting. She rated the film 3.4 out of 5 stars and commented: "As a film that attempts to teach Nigeria’s history through entertainment, Kunle Afolayan’s October 1 gets a pass. Brand Nigeria is depicted in the language, props and footage, but the problem with the film is that it tries to do too many things".

Box office
October 1 was very successful at the box office. It grossed approximately ₦60 million at the cinemas, making it the second highest grossing Nigerian film in Nigerian cinemas at the time of its release, tying with Half of a Yellow Sun. As of January 2015, The Nation estimates that October 1 had made a revenue of over ₦140 million, when its box office revenue is summed with the revenue generated from its numerous special screenings. In an interview with Nigerian Entertainment Today in February 2015, Afolayan also disclosed that the film had made over ₦100 million in 6 months.

Awards
October won three awards at the 2014 Africa International Film Festival, including the awards for "Best Feature Film", "Best Screenplay" and "Best Actor" for Sadiq Daba; October 1 was the film with most awards at the event. The film also leads at the 2015 Africa Magic Viewers Choice Awards, winning 9 awards out of 12 nominations, including awards for "Best Movie of the Year", "Best Movie Director" and "Best Actress" for Kehinde Bankole.

Themes
Sadiq Daba in an interview stated: "It [October 1] cuts across the whole of Nigeria and back to our colonial days. It talks about our ethnic intra-relationships and many more". The film explores issues on Paedophilia, depicting a young boy, Koya being molested by a western religious leader, Father Dowling, a supposed custodian of societal moral standards; This makes disappointed and angry Koya to hold the belief that "western education is evil", a slogan associated with the present day Boko Haram. Tunde Babalola, the scriptwriter commented: "As a writer, I want to delve into subjects that people don’t want to talk about. I don’t want to write things that people want to say. I would rather write about things that are controversial, and that which will get people talking for weeks". Victor Akande of The Nation comments: "October 1 captures the approach used by two young men who are vexed by a system (Western education) they expect will make them better humans, but which ends up corrupting their traditional upbringing".

The film also reflects on the unification of the Northern and Southern Protectorates of Nigeria up to Independence; there's a plot in the film where an innocent Nomad from the North is killed by an aggrieved Eastern parent, who believes that the man is responsible for his daughter's murder and feared that the suspect may eventually be favoured just because the police officer in charge of the case is a Northerner as well. According to Augustine Ogwo, "the movie is purely the story of Nigeria and the lack of unity and tolerance among the various ethnic groups".

The film has also been described as a metaphor of Nigeria and the discrimination it has experienced as a Nation; The killings in the film for instance depicts the massive stealing of the country's mineral resources by the West. There are also conversations in the film which suggests that Nigeria got its independence a little too early.

Home media
In December 2014, October 1 was released on DStv Explora's Video-on-demand service. In January 2015, it was announced that Netflix has acquired the worldwide online distribution rights for the film and it is slated to debut on the platform in March 2015.

See also
 List of Nigerian films of 2014

References

External links
 
 

2014 films
English-language Nigerian films
2014 psychological thriller films
Films set in 1960
Fiction set in 1960
Films directed by Kunle Afolayan
Films set in Western Nigeria
Yoruba-language films
Igbo-language films
Films shot in Lagos
Films shot in Ondo
Nigerian thriller films
Films about pedophilia
Films about rape
2010s historical films
2010s mystery films
Hausa-language films
Nigerian nonlinear narrative films
2010s crime thriller films
Nigerian mystery films
AMVCA Best Overall Film winners
Films produced by Kunle Afolayan
2010s English-language films